The 2020 Touring Car Trophy is the second season of the Touring Car Trophy. The championship features production-based touring cars built to either NGTC, TCR or Super 2000 specifications and will compete in fourteen races across seven meetings across England. The championship is aimed as a feeder category to the BTCC and operated by Stewart Lines' Maximum Group. For 2020, a revised list of regulations mean that both the TCR UK and TCT series will be combined to run as the same series; the Touring Car Trophy. As well as drivers competing overall for the TCT title, drivers in TCR-spec cars will also compete for the TCR UK trophy. The championship will also be supported by the Volkswagen Racing Cup, which is also run by Maximum Group. The Volkswagen Racing Cup competitors will race alongside the TCT grid in 2020.

Henry Neal won the Touring Car Trophy title and Lewis Kent won the TCR UK title.

Calendar 
The calendar was announced on 24 November 2019 with 7 rounds scheduled. The opening round, originally held at Silverstone on 17–18 April, was postponed due to the COVID-19 pandemic and the opening round moved to Croft on 6–7 June. The following rounds at Croft and Brands Hatch were then cancelled. On 21 May 2020 a new revised calendar was announced and three rounds were confirmed.

Teams and drivers

Race calendar and results

Championship standings

Drivers' Standings

Teams' Standings

References

External links
 

TCR
Touring Car Trophy
Touring Car Trophy
Touring Car Trophy